Leland Paul Kleinsasser (born November 12, 1934) is an American former politician. He served in the South Dakota House of Representatives from 1979 to 1980 and in the Senate from 1981 to 1988.

References

1934 births
Living people
Republican Party members of the South Dakota House of Representatives
Republican Party South Dakota state senators
People from Beadle County, South Dakota
People from Huron, South Dakota